M86 Security was a privately owned Internet threat protection company that specialized in Web and email security products and content filtering appliances. The company's international headquarters were located in Basingstoke, with development centers located in California, Israel and New Zealand.

History

1995-2008
Founded in 1995, the company changed its name to 8e6 Technologies in 2000. Its co-founder and CEO for ten years, George Shih, developed many of the technologies used in 8e6 Internet filtering products.

Originally, in an effort to provide “pornography-free Internet use for children”, the company offered filtering software for computers used in education environments. Later, 8e6 Technologies developed products to manage Internet access in other markets.

In 2002, Paul Myer joined the company as President and COO, joining George Shih to grow the company through expanded channels and marketing.  https://www.crn.com/news/security/192201623/8e6-technologies-takes-direct-approach-to-channel.htm

The company's Internet filtering, reporting and monitoring appliances were named a “Best Buy” by SC Magazine in 2007 and 2008.

In November 2008, 8e6 Technologies and Marshal Limited, a provider of email and Web security products, merged and became Marshal8e6. George Shih remained as interim CEO until former Finjan CEO, John Vigouroux, was named to the position in April 2009.

2008-current
In November 2008, 8e6 Technologies, a company that sold Web filtering products, and Marshal Software, a provider of integrated email and Web security products, merged to form Marshal8e6.

In March 2009, Marshal8e6 acquired Avinti, along with its behavior-based malware technology for detecting blended threats that occur through email. Upon completion of the merger, Avinti's CEO, William Kilmer, joined Marshal8e6 as its Chief Marketing Officer.

As part of a rebranding campaign, Marshal8e6 changed its name to M86 Security in September 2009. The following November, M86 Security acquired Finjan Software along with its Secure Web Gateway (formerly Finjan Vital Security) product and licenses to patents for real-time code analysis technology, giving the company malware detection and prevention capabilities for the Web gateway. The company had previously announced John Vigouroux, CEO of Finjan Software, as the new CEO of M86 Security.

Marshal's TRACE Labs and Finjan's Malicious Code Research Center combined to form M86 Security Labs, which researches and reports on Web and email-based security threats.
In August 2010, M86 ranked number 1,230 on the Inc. 5000 annual listing of the fastest private growing companies in America.

On March 6, 2012 it was announced that Chicago based Trustwave Holdings would acquire M86 Security. On March 19, 2012 Trustwave completed its acquisition of M86 Security and subsequently rebranded its products and operations under the Trustwave name.

References

Computer security software companies
Networking companies
Server appliance